Edrick Reginald Fredericks (born 31 December 1977) is a former South African rugby union player.

He earned representative colours by playing for the South African Under-21s in 1997 and for a South African 'A' side in 2003. He also played rugby sevens for South Africa in the 1999–2000 and 2004–2005 seasons.

He is currently the coach of Free State First League side Bloemfontein Crusaders.

References

External links
 Cheetahs profile
 
 

1977 births
Living people
South African rugby union players
Cheetahs (rugby union) players
Free State Cheetahs players
Bulls (rugby union) players
Western Province (rugby union) players
Lions (United Rugby Championship) players
Rugby union wings
South Africa international rugby sevens players
Male rugby sevens players